Butea monosperma is a species of Butea native to tropical and sub-tropical parts of the South Asia and Southeast Asia, ranging across 
Bangladesh, India, Nepal, Pakistan, Sri Lanka, Myanmar, Thailand, Laos, Cambodia, Vietnam, Malaysia, and western Indonesia. Common names include flame-of-the-forest, dhak, palash, and bastard teak. Revered as sacred by Hindus, it's prized for producing an abundance of vivid blooms, but it's also cultivated elsewhere as an ornamental. Butea monosperma, which grows slowly, creates a stunning specimen tree.

Description
It is a slow-growing tree: young trees have a growth rate of a few feet per year.

Flowers frequently have a spectacular late-winter bloom. Each flower features five petals, two wings, and a keel that resembles the beak of a curled parrot. If winter season is too cold, too dry, or too rainy, trees may not blossom.

History

Historically, Palash originated in Bihar and Jharkhand. Dhak forests covered much of the Doaba area between the Ganges and the Yamuna, but these were cleared for agriculture in the early 19th century as the English East India Company increased tax demands on the peasants.

Use
It is used for timber, resin, fodder, medicine, and dye. The wood is dirty white and soft. Being durable under water, it is used for well-curbs and water scoops. Spoons and ladles made of this tree are used in various Hindu rituals to pour ghee into the fire. Good charcoal can be obtained from it. Farmers typically utilise trees on field bunds and use them to reduce soil erosion. The young shoots are mostly used by buffaloes as fodder. The leaves were used by earlier generations of people to serve food where plastic plates would be used today.

Lac Production 
The tree serves as a crucial host in India for the lac bug (Laccifer lacca), which creates shellac. It produces the most lac sticks per hectare of any lac tree.

Leather Production
The bark produces a crimson exudate that, when dried, hardens into a substance called "Butea gum" or "Bengal kino." The gum is considered valuable by druggists because of its astringent qualities and by leather workers because of its tannin.

Culinary Use
The gum from the tree, called kamarkas in Hindi, is used in certain food dishes.

In Maharashtra state of India it is prepared as a summer beverage out of tea of the flower which is considered to have medicinal benefits

Patravali Plate

In villages of many parts of India, for example in Maharashtra, this tree provides the leaves that are used either with many pieced together or singly (only in case of a banana leaf) to make a leaf-plate for serving a meal. Up until a century ago, a would-be-son-in-law was tested on his dexterity in making this plate and bowl (used to serve daal, gravy dishes) before being declared acceptable by the father-in-law-to-be.

Dye
The flowers are used to prepare a traditional Holi colour called "Kesari".  It is also used as a dye for fabric. Butein, a vibrant yellow to deep orange-red dye made from the flowers, is used mostly for dying silk and occasionally for dying cotton. Hindus ink their foreheads with this colour.

Plantation Guide 
Best grown in sunny tropical locations. Best performance occurs in deep, fertile, organically rich, well-drained soils in full sun to part shade. Add surface mulch. Needs consistent moisture, but soils should begin to dry as winter approaches to encourage leaf drop by the beginning of winter. Plants should be sited in areas protected from strong winds.

Literature
The first sloka of the Sukla Yajurveda speaks about the Palasa tree. The Palasa tree branch is cut and trimmed by the Adhvaryu priest who performed the practical part of sacrifice, the day before a new moon or a full moon, and used it to drive the calves away from cows whose milk was to form a part of the offerings for the next day's special ceremony.

A History of the Sikhs Vol. 1, written by famous Punjabi writer Khushwant Singh, describes Punjab's landscape as: "While the margosa is still strewing the earth with its brittle ochre leaves, the silk cotton, the coral and the flame of the forest burst into flowers of bright crimson, red, and orange." References to this tree are often found in Punjabi literature. The Punjabi poet Harinder Singh Mehboob employed its symbolism in his poems.

In Rudyard Kipling's short story Beyond the Pale (contained in Plain Tales from the Hills, published in 1888), he says of the dhak: The flower of the dhak means diversely "desire", "come", "write", or "danger", according to the other things with it. The tree was also featured in The Jungle Book in the story Tiger! Tiger! as the tree Mowgli instructs his wolf-brother Grey Brother to wait under for a signal that Shere Khan has returned.

Cultural Associations
According to legend, the tree sprang from a falcon's feather that was infused with soma. The right side of Yama's body is where the plant, according to Vayupurana, had its start. This lovely tree is revered by both Hindus and Buddhists. It is said to have used as the tree for achieved enlightenment, or Bodhi by second Lord Buddha Medhaṅkara Buddha.

In West Bengal, it is associated with spring, especially through the poems and songs of Nobel Laureate Rabindranath Tagore, who likened its bright orange flame-like flower to fire. In Santiniketan, where Tagore and Vishalnarayan lived, this flower has become an indispensable part of the celebration of spring. The plant has lent its name to the town of Palashi, famous for the historic Battle of Plassey fought there.

In the state of Jharkhand, palash is associated with folk tradition. Many folk literary expressions describe palash as the forest fire. The beauty of dry deciduous forests of Jharkhand reach their height when most trees have shed their leaves and the Palash is in its full bloom. Palash is also the State Flower of Jharkhand.

It is said that the tree is a form of Agni, the God of fire and war. In Telangana, these flowers are specially used in the worship of Shiva on occasion of Shivaratri. In Telugu, this tree is called Moduga chettu.

In Kerala, it is called plasu, chamata or vishalnarayan. Chamata is the vernacular version of Sanskrit word harinee, small piece of wood that is used for agnihotra or the fire ritual. In most of the old Nambudiri (Kerala Brahmin) houses, one can find this tree because this is widely used for their fire ritual. Tamil Brahmins have a daily agnihotra ritual called Samidha Dhanan, where barks of this tree is a main component for agnihotra, and this ritual is very essential for brahmacharis during the first year of brahmacharya.

In Theravada Buddhism, called Medhankara – මේධංකර, Butea monosperma is said to have been used as the tree to achieve enlightenment, or Bodhi, by Buddha. The plant is known as කෑල in Sinhala.

Other Names

Flame-of-the-forest is otherwise known as tamāla (तमाल) Palasha (पलाश) (Sanskrit), ḍhāk (ढाक) (Nepali), bastard teak, parrot tree (Eng.), chichra tesu, desuka jhad, dhaak, palash, chalcha, kankrei, chheula (छेउला) (Hindi), paḷas (पळस) (Marathi), kesudo (કેસુુડો) (Gujarati), palashpapra (Urdu), Muthuga (ಮುತ್ತುಗ) (Kannada), kinshuk, polash (পলাশ) Bengali, pauk (Burmese), polāx (পলাশ) in Assamese, porasum, parasu (Tamil), muriku, shamata (Mal.), moduga (మోదుగ) (Telugu), khakda (Guj.), kela (Sinh.), ploso (Javanese), palash ପଳାଶ (Odia), semarkat api (Malay), Palay (Pushto).

In Sanskrit, the flower is extensively used as a symbol for the arrival of spring and the colour of love. Jayadeva in the Gita Govinda compares these blossoms to the red nails of Kamadeva or Cupid, with which the latter wounds the hearts of lovers. The imagery is all the more appropriate as the blossoms are compared to a net of kimsuka flowers (किंशुकजाले). In a completely leafless tree, the blossoms look like a net.

The following stanza is translated here by Barbara Stoller Miller, for kimsuka blossoms, she uses the common name "flame tree petals":
मृगमदसौरभरभसवशंवदनवदलमालतमाले।
युवजनहृदयविदारणमनसिजनखरुचिकिंशुकजाले॥

Tamala tree's fresh leaves absorb strong scent of deer musk.
Flame tree petals, shining nails of love, tear at young hearts.

Gita Govinda of Jayadeva, Love Song of the Dark Lord, Motilal Banarsidass

Gallery

References

Phaseoleae
Plants described in 1894
Trees of the Indian subcontinent
Trees of Indo-China
Trees of Java
Trees of Peninsular Malaysia
Symbols of Jharkhand